Grace Removals is an Australian Removals company.

History
Grace Removals was established in 1911 when retailer Grace Brothers established a furniture removal division in Sydney. In the mid-1960s it expanded to operate in all states in Australia. In 1984, Grace Removals was purchased by Brambles. In 1994 it was sold to Crown Worldwide Group.

References

External links
Official Website
Moving Companies

Companies based in Sydney
Logistics companies of Australia
Moving companies
1911 establishments in Australia